Prof. Baij Nath Puri (B. N. Puri) (born 26 January 1916, died 1996) was a historian from India. He completed M. Lit. and D.Phil. from Oxford University. He was vice-president and member of the International Board of Editors for the history of Civilizations in Central Asia at  UNESCO, and remained President of the Indian History Congress (Guwahati Session). He was also Professor and Head of the Department of Ancient Indian History and Culture at Lucknow University and later a professor emeritus.

Works
Some of his published works are:
India as described by early Greek writers. Indian Press, 1939.
 Indian History: A Review. Bharatiya Vidya Bhavan, 1960.
 India in classical Greek writings. New Order Book Co., 1963.
India under the Kushanas. Bharatiya Vidya Bhavan, 1965.
 Cities of ancient India. Meenakshi Prakashan, 1966.
 Studies in Early History and Administration in Assam. Department of Publication, Gauhati University, 1968.
India in the times of Patanjali. Bharatiya Vidya Bhavan, 1968.
 A Study of Indian History. Bharatiya Vidya Bhavan, 1971.
 A Social, Cultural, and Economic History of India, Vol. 1, with Pran Nath Chopra and Manmath Nath Das. Macmillan India, 1974.
History of Indian Administration: Vol. 2 Medieval period. Bharatiya Vidya Bhavan, 1975.
Buddhism in Central Asia,  Motilal Banarsidass, 2000.  .
The History of the Gurjara-Pratiharas
 Some aspects of the evolution of Indian administration. Indian Institute of Public Administration, 1980.
 The Changing Horizon. Print House (India), 1986. .
 The Khatris, a socio-cultural study. M.N. Publishers and Distributors, 1988.
 The Indian freedom struggle: a survey, (1857-1947). M.N. Publishers and Distributors, 1988.
 Secularism in Indian ethos. Atma Ram & Sons, 1990. .

References

 

20th-century Indian historians
Historians of India
Indian Indologists
1916 births
1996 deaths
Alumni of the University of Oxford
Academic staff of the University of Lucknow
Emeritus Professors in India
Indian expatriates in the United Kingdom